was a Japanese actor. He was best known for playing the central role of Private Mizushima in Kon Ichikawa's The Burmese Harp.

Career
Born in Tokyo, Yasui first joined a troupe led by Kazuo Hasegawa. He entered the Nikkatsu studio in 1954 and made his debut in a film scripted by Yasujirō Ozu. After starring in The Burmese Harp, he starred with his own family in the television show Chako-chan. He joined the Gekidan Shinpa troupe and become a main actor in their stage productions.

References

External links 

1928 births
Japanese male actors
2014 deaths